During the 1954–55 English football season, Arsenal F.C. competed in the Football League First Division.

Season summary

A lacklustre start to the season resulted in three consecutive defeats. This record poor start would last for 67 years, until Mikel Arteta's Arsenal side in the 2021–22 season went on to lose the first three games of the season.

Final league table

Results
Arsenal's score comes first

Legend

Football League First Division

FA Cup

Squad

References

https://www.bbc.co.uk/sport/football/58289653?at_medium=custom7&at_custom2=facebook_page&at_custom3=Match+of+the+Day&at_custom4=B25B19EE-0803-11EC-B3E2-8E5516F31EAE&at_custom1=%5Bpost+type%5D&at_campaign=64

Arsenal F.C. seasons
Arsenal